Stirrer may refer to:
Agitator, a general type of mechanical device
Magnetic stirrer, a laboratory device
Stirring rod, a simple laboratory tool
Stir stick, for stirring drinks
Stirring spoon, a type of spoon
Whisk or other kind of stirrer used in cooking
Mixer (appliance), a kitchen appliance